Terry Miller (born April 11, 1946) is a retired professional American football player who played linebacker for the Detroit Lions and St. Louis Cardinals.

Early years
Miller was a three-sport star at Arcola High School. He played forward for the Arcola basketball team that reached the "Sweet Sixteen" his senior year and was offered scholarships by several Big Ten schools. But Miller wanted to play football and was offered a scholarship by the University of Illinois where he played linebacker from 1964-1967.

Pro career
Miller was selected in the seventh round by the Detroit Lions in the 1968 NFL Draft but he hurt his back water skiing and never made it to training camp. He was on the taxi squad in 1969 and played in one game in 1970. He signed as a free agent with the St. Louis Cardinals in 1971 where he played for four seasons. Miller primarily played on special teams with the Cardinals, but he did start nine games at linebacker in 1972 and recorded one sack. 

Miller retired from football in 1975. He currently resides in Kentucky and is in the horse racing business.

References

1946 births
American football linebackers
Detroit Lions players
St. Louis Cardinals (football) players
Illinois Fighting Illini football players
Living people
Players of American football from Illinois
People from Mattoon, Illinois
People from Arcola, Illinois